Eddie or Eddy is a diminutive for given names such as Edward, Edmund, Edgar, Edison, Edsel, Edwin, Eduardo or Edmundo. It is also occasionally used as a given name on its own. Notable people known as Eddie or Eddy include:

Sports
Eddie Aikau (1946–1978), American surfer
Eddie Alvarez, American mixed martial artist
Eddie Charlton (1929–2004), Australian snooker and billiards player
Eddie Charlton (born 1988), English squash player
Eddie Cheever, American race car driver
Eddy Curry, American professional basketball player
Eddie "The Eagle" Edwards, British ski jumper
Eddie Elder, American football player
Eddie Fatu (1973–2009), Samoan-American wrestler
Eddie Foster (born 1954), American football player
Eddie Griffin (basketball) (1982–2007), American basketball player
Eddie Guardado, American baseball closer
Eddie Guerrero (1967–2005), Mexican-American professional wrestler
Eddie Hall (born 1988), English professional strongman, winner of the 2017 World's Strongest Man Competition 
 Eddy Hamel (1902–1943), American soccer player for Dutch club AFC Ajax who was killed by the Nazis in Auschwitz concentration camp
Eddie House (born 1978), American basketball player
Eddie Irvine, Northern Irish Formula One driver
Eddie Jackson (safety) (born 1993), American football player
Eddie Jones (basketball), American basketball player
Eddie Jones (rugby union), Australian rugby coach and former player
Eddy Koaz (born 1959), Israeli Olympic judoka
Eddy Merckx (born 1945), Belgian professional cyclist
Eddie Miles, American football player
Eddie Murray, American baseball player
Eddie O'Sullivan, head coach of Irish rugby team
Eddy Piñeiro (born 1995), American football player
Eddie Price, Tulane University Green Wave and NFL running back
Eddie Robinson (Basketball) (born 1976), American basketball player
Eddie Vanderdoes (born 1994), American football player
Eddy Wilson (American football) (born 1997), American football player

Music

Eddy Arnold (1918–2008), American country music singer and musician
Eddie Clarke (musician) (1950–2018), British guitarist, member of the band Motörhead
Eddy Chen (born 1993), Australian born-Taiwanese violinist, performing on the TwoSet Violin YouTube channel 
Eddie Cochran (1938–1960), American rockabilly musician
Eddie Fisher (singer) (1928–2010), American singer
Eddy Grant, Guyana-born British reggae musician
Eddie Harsch (1957–2016), Canadian keyboardist, member of The Black Crowes
Eddie "Evil Eddie" Jacobson, frontman for Australian band Butterfingers
Eddie McGuire, Australian television presenter and businessman
Eddy Mitchell, French rock singer and actor
Eddie Money (1949–2019), stage name of Edward Mahoney, American rock musician
Eddie Morton (1870–1938), American rag-time singer and comedian
Eddie Rabbitt (1941–1998), American country music singer and songwriter
Eddie Van Halen (1955–2020), American guitarist and songwriter
Eddie Vedder, American singer, musician and songwriter, frontman of Pearl Jam
Eddie (Iron Maiden), mascot of the band Iron Maiden

Acting
Eddie Cahill, American actor
Eddie Cibrian, Cuban-American actor
Eddie Garcia (1929–2019), Filipino actor, television personality, and producer
Eddie Izzard, English actor, comedian, writer and political activist.
Eddie Murphy, African-American actor, comedian and singer.
Eddie Paskey, American actor
Eddie Redmayne, English actor
Eddie Shin, Korean-American actor

Politics 
 Eddie Hughes (Australian politician)
 Eddie Hughes (British politician)

 Eddie Lumsden (born 1952), American politician

Other professions
Eddie Carmel (born Oded Ha-Carmeili; 1936–1972), Israeli-born entertainer with gigantism and acromegaly, popularly known as "The Jewish Giant"
Eddy de Jongh (born 1931), Dutch art historian
Eddie Fitte (born 1987), Argentinian journalist, writer
Eddie Linden, British-Irish poet and magazine editor
Eddie Mosley (1947–2020), American serial killer 
Eddie Price III, Louisiana elected official
Eddie Rickenbacker, American World War I flying ace, credited with shooting down more enemy planes than any other American pilot during that conflict
Eddie Villanueva, Filipino evangelist and president-founder of the Jesus Is Lord Church Worldwide
Eddie Woo, Australian mathematician

Fictional characters 
Eddie, a character played by Meat Loaf in the 1975 musical Rocky Horror Picture Show
Eddie, a character in 1998 American comedy movie My Giant
Eddie, a character in the movie 2009 American comedy film The Hangover
Eddie, a dog in the American sitcom Frasier
Eddie, the shipboard computer on the starship Heart of Gold in The Hitchhiker's Guide to the Galaxy
Eddie, one of the main characters in the Ice Age film franchise
Eddie, the antagonist of the racing video game Need for Speed: Underground, also appears in Need for Speed (2015 video game)
Eddy, a character played by Nico Jouvel in the British web series Corner Shop Show
Eddie Brock, anti-hero also known as Venom
Eddie Carr, field researcher from The Lost World by Michael Crichton
Eddie Dean (The Dark Tower), from The Dark Tower
Eddy Gordo, in the video game series Tekken
Eddie Haskell, a fictional character on the Leave It to Beaver television sitcom
Eddie Elizabeth Hitler, from the 1990s British comedy show Bottom, played by Adrian Edmondson
Eddie Kaspbrak, from Stephen King’s It
Eddie Lindstrom, a character in a 2001 American independent comedy-drama movie Little Secrets
Eddie Menuek, from the sitcom Friends
Eddie Morra, in the 2011 film Limitless
Eddie "The Freak" Munson, a character in season 4 of Stranger Things
Eddie Valiant, from Who Framed Roger Rabbit
Eddie Windass, in the British soap-opera Coronation Street
Eddie Winslow, from Family Matters
Eddie Russett, the protagonist in the novel Shades of Grey: The Road to High Saffron by Jasper Fforde.

See also 

 Eddy Rodríguez (disambiguation)
 Eddie the Eagle (disambiguation)
 Edie (name), given name and surname
 Eddy (surname)

English masculine given names
Given names
Hypocorisms
Masculine given names